UFC Fight Night: Lewis vs. Abdurakhimov (also known as UFC Fight Night 102) was a mixed martial arts event held by the Ultimate Fighting Championship on December 9, 2016, at Times Union Center in Albany, New York

Background
This event was the first that the organization hosted in Albany.

A heavyweight bout between Derrick Lewis and Shamil Abdurakhimov served as the event headliner.

A middleweight bout between Josh Samman and Oluwale Bamgbose was briefly linked to the event. However the pairing never materialized as Samman died on October 5, 2016. Joe Gigliotti was tabbed as his replacement. In turn, Bamgbose pulled out of the fight in mid-November citing an injury and was replaced by promotional newcomer Gerald Meerschaert.

Promotional newcomer Charlie Ward was expected to face Randy Brown at the event. However, Ward was pulled from the event in early November due to alleged visa issues which restricted his travel and was replaced by fellow newcomer Brian Camozzi.

Zubaira Tukhugov was scheduled to face Tiago Trator at the event. However, on November 14, Tukhugov was pulled from the card after being notified by USADA of a potential anti-doping violation stemming from an out-of-competition sample collected earlier. On November 28, Tukhugov was replaced by promotional newcomer Shane Burgos.

Aljamain Sterling was expected to face Raphael Assunção at the event. However, Sterling pulled out of the fight on November 23 citing injury. Assunção was subsequently removed from the card with the pairing expected to be rescheduled for a future event.

The Ultimate Fighter: Team Joanna vs. Team Cláudia women's strawweight winner Tatiana Suarez was expected to face Juliana Lima at the event. However, Suarez pulled out of the fight on November 23 citing injury. She was replaced on December 2 by promotional newcomer JJ Aldrich.

Patrick Cummins was expected to face Gian Villante at the event. However, Cummins pulled out of the fight on December 2 citing a staph infection. He was replaced by promotional newcomer Saparbek Safarov.

At the weigh-ins, Justine Kish came in at 116.4 lb, 0.4 lb over the women's strawweight limit of 116 lb. As a result, Kish was fined 20% of her purse, which went to her opponent Ashley Yoder and the bout proceeded as scheduled at a catchweight.

Results

Bonus awards
The following fighters were awarded $50,000 bonuses:
Fight of the Night: Gian Villante vs. Saparbek Safarov
Performance of the Night: Francis Ngannou and Gerald Meerschaert

See also
List of UFC events
2016 in UFC
Mixed martial arts in New York

References

UFC Fight Night
Mixed martial arts in New York (state)
Sports in Albany, New York
2016 in mixed martial arts
2016 in sports in New York (state),
Events in Albany, New York
December 2016 sports events in the United States